is a private university in Yokosuka, Kanagawa, Japan.

After the 1923 Great Kantō earthquake, it relocated to Shinagawa. It relocated again to Ota-ku, Tokyo in 1933, and to its present location in Yokosuka in 1964. It was chartered as a coeducational university in 1964.

Kanagawa Dental University Junior College is a subsidiary of the Kanagawa Dental College, and shares the same campus.

Alumni
Etsuji Arai (born 1957), politician

External links
 

 
Educational institutions established in 1910
1910 establishments in Japan
Private universities and colleges in Japan
Universities and colleges in Kanagawa Prefecture
Buildings and structures in Yokosuka, Kanagawa
Dental schools in Japan
Educational institutions established in 1964
1964 establishments in Japan